Eupithecia steeleae is a moth in the family Geometridae. It was described by David Stephen Fletcher in 1951. It is found in Cameroon.

References

Endemic fauna of Cameroon
Moths described in 1951
steeleae
Insects of Cameroon
Moths of Africa